Gammelsdorf is a municipality in the district of Freising in Bavaria in Germany.

It was the site of the 1313 Battle of Gammelsdorf.

Until the mid-1990s Gammelsdorf was home of the "Circus", formerly known as the world's first village cinema, and later 
a nightclub where many famous artists and rock bands held concerts, most notably Nirvana.

References

External links
Circus Gammelsdorf at the sub-bavaria.de wiki

Freising (district)